Otto Rottman was a Romanian athlete. He competed in the men's javelin throw at the 1928 Summer Olympics.

References

External links
 

Year of birth missing
Possibly living people
Athletes (track and field) at the 1928 Summer Olympics
Romanian male javelin throwers
Olympic athletes of Romania
Place of birth missing